Waldinger is a surname. Notable people with the surname include:

Adolf Waldinger (1843–1904), Croatian painter
Richard Waldinger, American computer scientist
Robert J. Waldinger (born 1951), American psychiatrist and professor

See also
Gallery Waldinger, art museum in Croatia
German toponymic surnames